James Wallace may refer to:

Sports
Jim Wallace (footballer) (born 1954), Scottish footballer for Dunfermline Athletic, Aldershot and Alloa Athletic
James Wallace (English footballer) (born 1991), English footballer for Fleetwood Town
James Wallace (footballer, fl. 1928–1931), Scottish football defender for Burnley
James Wallace (footballer, born 2000), Scottish footballer
Jamie Wallace, Canadian field hockey player
Jim Wallace (rugby league), rugby league footballer of the 1920s for Great Britain, England, and St. Helens Recs
Jim Wallace (baseball) (1881–1953), baseball player
Bo Wallace (baseball) (James Alfred Wallace, 1929–2000), American baseball player

Politicians
James M. Wallace (1750–1823), United States Congressman from Pennsylvania
James Wallace (British politician) (1729–1783), British Member of Parliament for Horsham, Attorney-General
Jim Wallace, Baron Wallace of Tankerness (born 1954), Deputy First Minister of Scotland for 1999–2005
James P. Wallace (1928–2017), Justice of the Supreme Court of Texas

Musicians
James Wallace, American musician, lead singer of James Wallace & the Naked Light
James "Bo" Wallace, American musician, former bassist for metal band Iced Earth
Scruffy Wallace, bagpipe player for Celtic Punk band Dropkick Murphys

Other people
Sir James Wallace (philanthropist) (born 1937), New Zealand businessman and arts patron
James Wallace (Royal Navy officer) (1731–1803), Commodore Governor for the Canadian province of Newfoundland and Labrador
James D. Wallace, American moral philosopher
James Wallace (benefactor) (1821–1885), namesake of German Wallace College, Berea, Ohio
James Wallace (botanist) (died 1724), Scottish physician and botanist
James Wallace (minister) (1642–1688), Scottish topographer
Jim Wallace (Australian activist), former commander of the Australian Special Air Service Regiment and current Managing Director of the Australian Christian Lobby
James Maxwell Wallace (1785–1867), British Army officer

Other uses
James Wallace (novel), a 1788 novel by Robert Bage

See also
James Wallis (disambiguation)

Wallace, James